Peñarroya-Pueblonuevo is a Municipality located in the province of Córdoba, Spain. According to the 2014 census, the municipality has a population of 385 inhabitants. Its postal code is 14200.

It is a mining town located in the Sierra Morena, at the northern end of Córdoba Province near Extremadura.

History
The name of the present-day town originated in the merger of the towns of Peñarroya and Pueblonuevo del Terrible in 1927. The town of Pueblonuevo del Terrible had its name from a fierce dog that had lived there in the past and according to the legend, he discovered the charcoal in the area. The dog had been nicknamed "Terrible". 

The Battle of Peñarroya took place between 5 January and 4 February 1939 towards the end of the Spanish Civil War in the area of the town, which was located near the Extremaduran front line.

See also
Battle of Valsequillo

References

External links

Peñarroya-Pueblonuevo - Sistema de Información Multiterritorial de Andalucía

Municipalities in the Province of Córdoba (Spain)